The Dental Manufacturing Company Limited were manufacturers of dental equipment, motor silencers and agricultural equipment.

Company history

In the 1890s L. Gardner and Sons made dentists' chairs for the company, 106 units being produced over a period of three years, some lifted hydraulically, and others by a rack and pinion system. In 1914 the company was located at Alston House, Newman Street, London, W., and produced artificial teeth, dental rubbers, dental chairs, vulcanizers' instruments and dentists' requisites. It also had offices in Manchester, Glasgow, and Dublin.

References

Dental equipment